U.S. Route 50 (US 50) in the state of Illinois is an east–west highway across the southern portion of the state. It runs from the Jefferson Barracks Bridge, over the Mississippi River, to Missouri east, to the Red Skelton Memorial Bridge, over the Wabash River and to Indiana.

Route description 
US 50 runs east–west across the southern portion of the state, between Interstate 70 (I-70) to the north and I-64 to the south. Along many portions of US 50, the road has been moved onto either a bypass or an expressway.

Missouri state line to Flora
After US 50 and I-255 leave Mehlvile and enter Columbia, they then run concurrently with Illinois Route 3 (IL 3), as well as the Great River Road, at a directional T interchange (exit 6). At a trumpet interchange (exit 10), IL 3 and the Great River Road leave the freeway. Further northeast, they meet IL 157 at a parclo interchange with five ramps, Mousette Lane at a diamond interchange, IL 15 at a cloverleaf interchange, and State Street at a four-ramp parclo interchange. At the next interchange, US 50 moves off I-255 to I-64 at a cloverleaf interchange with collector–distributor lanes. Once US 50 moves onto I-64, it continues eastward. They meet IL 157 at a four-ramp parclo, IL 159 at a six-ramp parclo, and a few other interchanges before they reach another cloverleaf. At that point, US 50 turns north from I-64, briefly overlapping IL 158 until US 50 turns east.

In Lebanon, US 50 turns north and then east via IL 4. As it continues eastward, it remains a two-lane undivided highway. North of Trenton and Breese, each part of US 50 briefly becomes a four-lane divided highway with one diamond interchange each (one with IL 160 and one with Jamestown Road respectively). Each section reverts to an undivided highway.

In Carlyle, US 50 turns south and then back east (overlapping IL 127). In Sandoval, it turns north and then back east again (overlapping US 51). In Salem, it meets I-57 west of downtown and IL 37 within downtown.

Flora to Indiana state line
As US 50 meanders eastward, it eventually reaches US 45 north of Flora. At that point, US 45 runs concurrently with US 50. Then, it branches off south from US 50. Further east, it reaches Salem. At that point, IL 250 begins west of Noble and then travels northeast to downtown Noble and Olney. As US 50 intersects IL 130 south of Olney, IL 250 overlaps US 50.

Just north of Sumner, IL 250 moves off south to Sumner and Bridgeport. Just northwest of Lawrenceville, US 50 Business begins; it serves downtown Lawrenceville. Across the Embarras River, US 50 reaches a one-quadrant interchange with IL 1.

East of Lawrenceville, US 50 becomes a four-lane divided highway for the rest of its run in the state. It meets US 50 Business at an incomplete interchange, a diamond interchange, and IL 33 at a modified diamond interchange before exiting Illinois.

History 
Much of US 50 in Illinois, especially the section between Carlyle and Vincennes, lies atop or adjacent to the trail taken by George Rogers Clark and his 170 volunteers in the forlorn-hope march on Vincennes in February 1779.

Up until 1935, Illinois Route 12 (IL 12) followed roughly along the old alignment of US 50 from the Missouri state line east of St. Louis to the Indiana state line west of Vincennes, IN. By 1935, IL 12 was decommissioned.

As of 2011, much of US 50 is a two-lane highway, but portions around Lawrenceville and Vincennes are configured as a four-lane, limited access bypass, built to Interstate Highway standards in the 1960s. Another modern bypass portion between O'Fallon and IL 127 shows evidence of a four-lane right of way as each bridge is paralleled by a second that remains unused and the graded roadbed for additional lanes is visible.

Major intersections

References

External links

50
 Illinois
Transportation in Monroe County, Illinois
Transportation in St. Clair County, Illinois
Transportation in Clinton County, Illinois
Transportation in Marion County, Illinois
Transportation in Clay County, Illinois
Transportation in Richland County, Illinois
Transportation in Lawrence County, Illinois